Web ranking may refer to:

 Alexa web ranking system
 Compete.com, web ranking analysis based on United States traffic
 Google PageRank, link analysis algorithm
 Webometrics Ranking of World Universities, Ranking Web of World Universities